Alaskan Creoles are an Alaskan ethnic group. They descend from citizens of colonial Alaska, known as Russian Creoles. As an ethnic group, their ancestry is mainly of Sibero-Russian, Aleut, Yupik, Eskimo, and other Alaskan Native origin.

Alaskan Creole nationality

The Creole class of Russian Alaska

In Russian Alaska, the term Creole was not a racial category, rather the designation of "colonial citizen" in the Russian Empire. Creoles constituted a privileged class in Alaska that could serve in the Russian military, had free education paid by the colonial government, and had the opportunity of social mobility in both colonial Alaska and in the Russian Empire.

Creoles played an important role in Russian Alaska, as they managed colonial outposts & founded new Russian Creole towns. Their professions varied widely: they were teachers, clergy, navigators, cartographers, ship commanders, missionaries, hunters, interpreters, administrators and artists. The Creoles held a position of honor and respectability in colonial Alaska.

While many Creoles initially were the offspring of Sibero-Russian promyshlenniki (frontiersmen) who married native Alaskan women, the colonial government of Alaska made it possible for all Alaskan natives to become Creole if they pledged allegiance to the Alaskan government, thus becoming naturalized citizens. Being Creole was a matter of education, spirit, state of mind, and self-identity.

Creoles had tax-exemption from Imperial Russia if they stayed and lived at home in colonial Alaska; they were citizens of various Creole towns, such as the Alaskan capital of New Archangel (Sitka, Alaska). Alaskan Creoles & natives were indiscernible except in that Creoles were more likely to dress in a Russian style.

Alaskan natives seeking free education & Creoles natively born in Alaska had access to free education by the colonial government; in exchange for free education, the colonial government required them to enlist in obligatory state & military service for at least ten years.

Alaskan Creole society

The development of arts, architecture, and music during the Russian period combined traditional Alaska Native techniques with Old Russian culture derived from the Byzantine Church. Cross-cultural borrowings were the characteristic of the period; an example of this cross-cultural borrowing was the Alaskan celebration of Christmas incorporating traditional masked performances.

Russian Alaskan society was characterized by multilingualism & multiculturalism. Generally three languages were used: Church Slavonic was used for religion; for official and educational purposes, Russian was used; Alaska Native languages were used for colloquial purposes. Specific usage of each language depended on the locale within Alaska; in many regions of colonial Alaska, Russian was spoken as a colloquial language as much as Alaska Native languages, and Alaska Native languages were spoken during religious service for liturgy and songs. 

Alaskan Creoles spoke Russian and their local Alaska Native language; they could read and write both. Creoles also maintained Alaska Native traditions and continued native hunting methods using native weapons.

After the Sale of Alaska, the multilingual-multicultural Alaskan society did continue; English became increasingly important as more Americans immigrated to Alaska. In 1898 for example, Vladmir Modestov, a priest of the Russian Church, took a Creole boy named Iakov Orlov to San Francisco both to improve his Russian and to learn English; Modestov remarked that English "is becoming essential even in the North of Alaska".

Alaskan Creole scientific advances

The Alaskan Creoles made significant contributions to world science, particularly in the domains of hydrography, geography, and cartography. Americans unconditionally acknowledged Alaskan Russian scientific advances & achievements in the years following the sale of Alaska. American explorers in Alaska used a large number of Alaskan Russian scientific papers and brought them into the light of international scholarship. 

The government of colonial Alaska frequently collected geographical data through expeditions lead by Creole scientists and ship commanders. Creole explorers also made expeditions into the interior of Alaska to connect & trade with uncontacted native tribes and to introduce them to Christianity. Alaskan Russian explorations made great advancements in the 1820s and 1840s, such as the expeditions of Vasilev (1829), Glazunov (1833), Ivan Malakhov (1832-1839) and Zagokin (1842-1844). 

Tebenkhov, a Creole printer and citizen of New Archangel, compiled all of the data of these expeditions into a scientific atlas titled "Atlas of the Northwest Coasts of America" in 1852. Tebenkhov's atlas served as a navigational aid for sailing through Alaskan territory and it became the basis of American cartography in Alaska for decades after the Sale of Alaska.

The Sale of Alaska, 1867

When the American Union purchased Alaska from the Russian Empire in 1867, the Creoles were disenfranchised. Americans looked down on Creoles with contempt because they associated the term "Creole" with the meaning of "mixed race".

In New Archangel (Sitka), after the colonial government transferred sovereignty to the American forces, the Creoles of the town were amazed by the American soldiers. Creole officials, farmers, and employees all opened their homes to the Americans with full Russian hospitality; in many instances the Americans committed robberies and assaults on Creoles overnight. The Creoles of Sitka were eventually compelled to begin locking their doors from the Americans and wait until sunrise.

Having lost their social status under American rule, Alaskan Creoles began to look back on Alaska's colonial period as the golden age of their civilization.

American seizure of Alaskan Creole property
In the Treaty of Alaskan Cession, Alaskan Creoles were guaranteed the choice to either become American citizens, with full protections of property & liberty, or to emigrate to Russian territory. The Americans ignored the guarantee for the majority of Creoles; only the property of the Russian Orthodox Church and its legal rights were protected.  

The American government gave guarantee certificates to only 20 Alaskan Creoles. During the hour that the transfer of Alaska took place, the Alaskans lost all rights to their land & property. Some Creoles were listed on a registry that mentioned their ownership of a house, but they lost all rights to their land. All properties on the island of Kodiak were transferred immediately to the American government. 

The property transfer in Alaska was enacted rapidly and harshly. U.S. Brigadier General Davis, who oversaw the transfer on Baranof Island, remarked: "The Russians hurried to clear all buildings designated for transfer to the American government. This speedy relinquishment of the best dwellings caused considerable inconvenience to the chief administrator and to those people who had to get out of their houses under the local rainy weather, the majority of them moving to ships." 

A Tlingit chief of Baranof island, witnessing the property transfer, angrily remarked: "We indeed permitted the Russians to administer the island, but we have no intention to give it to any and every fellow who comes along".

Alaskan Creoles in American Alaska

The Alaskan colonial government stipulated three years to transport any Russian subjects who wanted to remain in the Russian Empire. The American government then began a program to Americanize the Creoles & Alaskan natives. They opened English schools and began the process of Americanization in Alaska.

Not all Alaskan Russians who wanted to leave could take advantage of the three year grace period to evacuate Alaska; in 1869, only two years after the Sale of Alaska, Alaska's colonial government lost all rights to act in Alaska, and had to entirely abandon the Creoles without any government support.

Creoles were forced to work under U.S. military supervisors, and their situation became increasingly desperate. An American observer recorded this desperation: "As often happens under such harsh systems, the people lose any sense of responsibility for themselves that they used to have, their intellectual powers atrophy more and more and they sink into a state of animal apathy, knowing all too well that they will have their piece of daily bread and will gain nothing more in the future, no matter how hard they try to work".

Alaskan Creoles did eventually gain enfranchisement. The following is a passage from Alaska's Governor in 1885 considering enfranchisement of Creoles in the Aleutian Islands:

Alaskan Creoles today

Alaskan Creoles still speak Alaskan Russian on Kodiak Island and in the village of Ninilchik (Kenai Peninsula), Alaska; Alaskan Russian has been isolated from other varieties of Russian for over a century.

Notable people

 Loren Leman, Lieutenant Governor of Alaska
 St.Jacob Netsvetov (1802-1864), "Enlightener of Alaska", Saint of the Russian Orthodox Church in Alaska

References

Creole peoples
Alaska Native ethnic groups